Spring Grove Township is located in Warren County, Illinois, United States. As of the 2010 census, its population was 1,013 and it contained 598 housing units.

A portion of the village of Alexis is located in this township.

Geography

Demographics

References

External links
City-data.com
Illinois State Archives

Townships in Warren County, Illinois
Townships in Illinois